The 1888 United States presidential election in Texas took place on November 6, 1888, as part of the 1888 United States presidential election. State voters chose 13 representatives, or electors, to the Electoral College, who voted for president and vice president.

Texas was won by the incumbent President Grover Cleveland (D–New York), running with the former Senator and Chief Justice of the Supreme Court of Ohio Allen G. Thurman, with 65.70% of the popular vote, against former Senator Benjamin Harrison (R-Indiana), running with Levi P. Morton, the 31st governor of New York, with 24.73% of the vote and former Illinois state representative Alson Streeter (L–Illinois), running with Charles E. Cunningham, with 8.24% of the vote.

The Prohibition Party ran brigadier general Clinton B. Fisk and John A. Brooks and received 1.33% of the vote.

Results

See also
 United States presidential elections in Texas

References

Texas
1888
1888 Texas elections